Thompson Teteh (born 12 July 1989) is a Papua New Guinea rugby league footballer who played for Featherstone Rovers in the Betfred Championship. Teteh previously played for the PNG Hunters and the Redcliffe Dolphins in the Queensland Cup in Australia, and has represented the Papua New Guinean national team.

Background
Teteh was born in Lae, Morobe, Papua New Guinea.

Playing career 
Teteh trained with the South Sydney Rabbitohs on a six-week trial contract during the 2015 pre-season. After playing 50 games for the PNG Hunters, Teteh joined the Dolphins at the start of the 2017 season. and returned to the PNG Hunters in 2018 due to visa renewal issues.

References

External links
2017 RLWC profile

1989 births
Living people
Featherstone Rovers players
Papua New Guinean rugby league players
Redcliffe Dolphins players
Papua New Guinea Hunters players
Papua New Guinea national rugby league team players
Rugby league centres